Structural coloration in animals, and a few plants, is the production of colour by microscopically structured surfaces fine enough to interfere with visible light instead of pigments, although some structural coloration occurs in combination with pigments. For example, peacock tail feathers are pigmented brown, but their microscopic structure makes them also reflect blue, turquoise, and green light, and they are often iridescent.

Structural coloration was first observed by English scientists Robert Hooke and Isaac Newton, and its principle – wave interference – explained by Thomas Young a century later. Young described iridescence as the result of interference between reflections from two or more surfaces of thin films, combined with refraction as light enters and leaves such films. The geometry then determines that at certain angles, the light reflected from both surfaces interferes constructively, while at other angles, the light interferes destructively. Different colours therefore appear at different angles.

In animals such as on the feathers of birds and the scales of butterflies, interference is created by a range of photonic mechanisms, including diffraction gratings, selective mirrors, photonic crystals, crystal fibres, matrices of nanochannels and proteins that can vary their configuration. Some cuts of meat also show structural coloration due to the exposure of the periodic arrangement of the muscular fibres. Many of these photonic mechanisms correspond to elaborate structures visible by electron microscopy. In the few plants that exploit structural coloration, brilliant colours are produced by structures within cells. The most brilliant blue coloration known in any living tissue is found in the marble berries of Pollia condensata, where a spiral structure of cellulose fibrils produces Bragg's law scattering of light. The bright gloss of buttercups is produced by thin-film reflection by the epidermis supplemented by yellow pigmentation, and strong diffuse scattering by a layer of starch cells immediately beneath.

Structural coloration has potential for industrial, commercial and military application, with biomimetic surfaces that could provide brilliant colours, adaptive camouflage, efficient optical switches and low-reflectance glass.

History 

In his 1665 book Micrographia, Robert Hooke described the "fantastical" colours of the peacock's feathers:

In his 1704 book Opticks, Isaac Newton described the mechanism of the colours other than the brown pigment of peacock tail feathers. Newton noted that

Thomas Young (1773–1829) extended Newton's particle theory of light by showing that light could also behave as a wave. He showed in 1803 that light could diffract from sharp edges or slits, creating interference patterns.

In his 1892 book Animal Coloration, Frank Evers Beddard (1858–1925) acknowledged the existence of structural colours:

But Beddard then largely dismissed structural coloration, firstly as subservient to pigments: "in every case the [structural] colour needs for its display a background of dark pigment;" and then by asserting its rarity: "By far the commonest source of colour in invertebrate animals is the presence in the skin of definite pigments", though he does later admit that the Cape golden mole has "structural peculiarities" in its hair that "give rise to brilliant colours".

Principles

Structure not pigment 

Structural coloration is caused by interference effects rather than by pigments.  Colours are produced when a material is scored with fine parallel lines, or formed of one or more parallel thin layers, or otherwise composed of microstructures on the scale of the colour's wavelength.

Structural coloration is responsible for the blues and greens of the feathers of many birds (the bee-eater, kingfisher and roller, for example), as well as many butterfly wings, beetle wing-cases (elytra) and (while rare among flowers) the gloss of buttercup petals. These are often iridescent, as in peacock feathers and nacreous shells such as of pearl oysters (Pteriidae) and Nautilus. This is because the reflected colour depends on the viewing angle, which in turn governs the apparent spacing of the structures responsible. Structural colours can be combined with pigment colours: peacock feathers are pigmented brown with melanin, while buttercup petals have both carotenoid pigments for yellowness and thin films for reflectiveness.

Principle of iridescence 

Iridescence, as explained by Thomas Young in 1803, is created when extremely thin films reflect part of the light falling on them from their top surfaces. The rest of the light goes through the films, and a further part of it is reflected from their bottom surfaces. The two sets of reflected waves travel back upwards in the same direction. But since the bottom-reflected waves travelled a little farther – controlled by the thickness and refractive index of the film, and the angle at which the light fell – the two sets of waves are out of phase. When the waves are one or more whole wavelengths apart – in other words, at certain specific angles, they add (interfere constructively), giving a strong reflection. At other angles and phase differences, they can subtract, giving weak reflections. The thin film therefore selectively reflects just one wavelength – a pure colour – at any given angle, but other wavelengths – different colours – at different angles. So, as a thin-film structure such as a butterfly's wing or bird's feather moves, it seems to change colour.

Mechanisms

Fixed structures 

A number of fixed structures can create structural colours, by mechanisms including diffraction gratings, selective mirrors, photonic crystals, crystal fibres and deformed matrices. Structures can be far more elaborate than a single thin film: films can be stacked up to give strong iridescence, to combine two colours, or to balance out the inevitable change of colour with angle to give a more diffuse, less iridescent effect. Each mechanism offers a specific solution to the problem of creating a bright colour or combination of colours visible from different directions.

A diffraction grating constructed of layers of chitin and air gives rise to the iridescent colours of various butterfly wing scales as well as to the tail feathers of birds such as the peacock. Hooke and Newton were correct in their claim that the peacock's colours are created by interference, but the structures responsible, being close to the wavelength of light in scale (see micrographs), were smaller than the striated structures they could see with their light microscopes. Another way to produce a diffraction grating is with tree-shaped arrays of chitin, as in the wing scales of some of the brilliantly coloured tropical Morpho butterflies (see drawing). Yet another variant exists in Parotia lawesii, Lawes's parotia, a bird of paradise. The barbules of the feathers of its brightly coloured breast patch are V-shaped, creating thin-film microstructures that strongly reflect two different colours, bright blue-green and orange-yellow. When the bird moves the colour switches sharply between these two colours, rather than drifting iridescently. During courtship, the male bird systematically makes small movements to attract females, so the structures must have evolved through sexual selection.

Photonic crystals can be formed in different ways. In Parides sesostris, the emerald-patched cattleheart butterfly, photonic crystals are formed of arrays of nano-sized holes in the chitin of the wing scales. The holes have a diameter of about 150 nanometres and are about the same distance apart. The holes are arranged regularly in small patches; neighbouring patches contain arrays with differing orientations. The result is that these emerald-patched cattleheart scales reflect green light evenly at different angles instead of being iridescent. In Lamprocyphus augustus, a weevil from Brazil, the chitin exoskeleton is covered in iridescent green oval scales. These contain diamond-based crystal lattices oriented in all directions to give a brilliant green coloration that hardly varies with angle. The scales are effectively divided into pixels about a micrometre wide. Each such pixel is a single crystal and reflects light in a direction different from its neighbours.

Selective mirrors to create interference effects are formed of micron-sized bowl-shaped pits lined with multiple layers of chitin in the wing scales of Papilio palinurus, the emerald swallowtail butterfly. These act as highly selective mirrors for two wavelengths of light. Yellow light is reflected directly from the centres of the pits; blue light is reflected twice by the sides of the pits. The combination appears green, but can be seen as an array of yellow spots surrounded by blue circles under a microscope.

Crystal fibres, formed of hexagonal arrays of hollow nanofibres, create the bright iridescent colours of the bristles of Aphrodita, the sea mouse, a non-wormlike genus of marine annelids. The colours are aposematic, warning predators not to attack. The chitin walls of the hollow bristles form a hexagonal honeycomb-shaped photonic crystal; the hexagonal holes are 0.51 μm apart. The structure behaves optically as if it consisted of a stack of 88 diffraction gratings, making Aphrodita one of the most iridescent of marine organisms.

Deformed matrices, consisting of randomly oriented nanochannels in a spongelike keratin matrix, create the diffuse non-iridescent blue colour of Ara ararauna, the blue-and-yellow macaw. Since the reflections are not all arranged in the same direction, the colours, while still magnificent, do not vary much with angle, so they are not iridescent.

Spiral coils, formed of helicoidally stacked cellulose microfibrils, create Bragg reflection in the "marble berries" of the African herb Pollia condensata, resulting in the most intense blue coloration known in nature. The berry's surface has four layers of cells with thick walls, containing spirals of transparent cellulose spaced so as to allow constructive interference with blue light. Below these cells is a layer two or three cells thick containing dark brown tannins. Pollia produces a stronger colour than the wings of Morpho butterflies, and is one of the first instances of structural coloration known from any plant. Each cell has its own thickness of stacked fibres, making it reflect a different colour from its neighbours, and producing a pixellated or pointillist effect with different blues speckled with brilliant green, purple, and red dots. The fibres in any one cell are either left-handed or right-handed, so each cell circularly polarizes the light it reflects in one direction or the other. Pollia is the first organism known to show such random polarization of light, which, nevertheless does not have a visual function, as the seed-eating birds who visit this plant species are not able to perceive polarised light. Spiral microstructures are also found in scarab beetles where they produce iridescent colours.

Thin film with diffuse reflector, based on the top two layers of a buttercup's petals. The brilliant yellow gloss derives from a combination, rare among plants, of yellow pigment and structural coloration. The very smooth upper epidermis acts as a reflective and iridescent thin film; for example, in Ranunculus acris, the layer is 2.7 micrometres thick. The unusual starch cells form a diffuse but strong reflector, enhancing the flower's brilliance. The curved petals form a paraboloidal dish which directs the sun's heat to the reproductive parts at the centre of the flower, keeping it some degrees Celsius above the ambient temperature.

Surface gratings, consisting of ordered surface features due to exposure of ordered muscle cells on cuts of meat. The structural coloration on meat cuts appears only after the ordered pattern of muscle fibrils is exposed and light is diffracted by the proteins in the fibrils. The coloration or wavelength of the diffracted light depends on the angle of observation and can be enhanced by covering the meat with translucent foils. Roughening the surface or removing water content by drying causes the structure to collapse, thus, the structural coloration to disappear.

Interference from multiple total internal reflections can occur in microscale structures, such as sessile water droplets and biphasic oil-in-water droplets as well as polymer microstructured surfaces. In this structural coloration mechanism, light rays that travel by different paths of total internal reflection along an interface interfere to generate iridescent colour.

Variable structures 

Some animals including cephalopods such as squid are able to vary their colours rapidly for both camouflage and signalling. The mechanisms include reversible proteins which can be switched between two configurations. The configuration of reflectin proteins in chromatophore cells in the skin of the Doryteuthis pealeii squid is controlled by electric charge. When charge is absent, the proteins stack together tightly, forming a thin, more reflective layer; when charge is present, the molecules stack more loosely, forming a thicker layer. Since chromatophores contain multiple reflectin layers, the switch changes the layer spacing and hence the colour of light that is reflected.

Blue-ringed octopuses spend much of their time hiding in crevices whilst displaying effective camouflage patterns with their dermal chromatophore cells.  If they are provoked, they quickly change colour, becoming bright yellow with each of the 50-60 rings flashing bright iridescent blue within a third of a second.  In the greater blue-ringed octopus (Hapalochlaena lunulata), the rings contain multi-layer iridophores.  These are arranged to reflect blue–green light in a wide viewing direction. The fast flashes of the blue rings are achieved using muscles under neural control. Under normal circumstances, each ring is hidden by contraction of muscles above the iridophores. When these relax and muscles outside the ring contract, the bright blue rings are exposed.

Examples

In technology 

Gabriel Lippmann won the Nobel Prize in Physics in 1908 for his work on a structural coloration method of colour photography, the Lippmann plate. This used a photosensitive emulsion fine enough for the interference caused by light waves reflecting off the back of the glass plate to be recorded in the thickness of the emulsion layer, in a monochrome (black and white) photographic process. Shining white light through the plate effectively reconstructs the colours of the photographed scene.

In 2010, the dressmaker Donna Sgro made a dress from Teijin Fibers' Morphotex, an undyed fabric woven from structurally coloured fibres, mimicking the microstructure of Morpho butterfly wing scales. The fibres are composed of 61 flat alternating layers, between 70 and 100 nanometres thick, of two plastics with different refractive indices, nylon and polyester, in a transparent nylon sheath with an oval cross-section. The materials are arranged so that the colour does not vary with angle. The fibres have been produced in red, green, blue, and violet.

Structural coloration could be further exploited industrially and commercially, and research that could lead to such applications is under way. A direct parallel would be to create active or adaptive military camouflage fabrics that vary their colours and patterns to match their environments, just as chameleons and cephalopods do. The ability to vary reflectivity to different wavelengths of light could also lead to efficient optical switches that could function like transistors, enabling engineers to make fast optical computers and routers.

The surface of the compound eye of the housefly is densely packed with microscopic projections that have the effect of reducing reflection and hence increasing transmission of incident light. Similarly, the eyes of some moths have antireflective surfaces, again using arrays of pillars smaller than the wavelength of light. "Moth-eye" nanostructures could be used to create low-reflectance glass for windows, solar cells, display devices, and military stealth technologies. Antireflective biomimetic surfaces using the "moth-eye" principle can be manufactured by first creating a mask by lithography with gold nanoparticles, and then performing reactive-ion etching.

See also 
 Animal coloration
 Camouflage
 Patterns in nature

Bibliography

Pioneering books 
 Beddard, Frank Evers (1892). Animal Coloration, An Account of the Principal Facts and Theories Relating to the Colours and Markings of Animals. Swan Sonnenschein, London.
 --- 2nd Edition, 1895.
 Hooke, Robert (1665). Micrographia, John Martyn and James Allestry, London.
 Newton, Isaac (1704). Opticks, William Innys, London.

Research 
 Fox, D.L. (1992). Animal Biochromes and Animal Structural Colours. University of California Press.
 Johnsen, S. (2011). The Optics of Life: A Biologist's Guide to Light in Nature. Princeton University Press.
 Kolle, M. (2011). Photonic Structures Inspired by Nature . Springer.

General books 
 Brebbia, C.A. (2011). Colour in Art, Design and Nature. WIT Press.
 Lee, D.W. (2008). Nature's Palette: The Science of Plant Color. University of Chicago Press.
 Kinoshita, S. (2008). "Structural Color in the Realm of Nature". World Scientific Publishing
 Mouchet, S. R., Deparis, O. (2021). "Natural Photonics and Bioinspiration". Artech House

Notes

References

External links 
 National Geographic News: Peacock Plumage Secrets Uncovered
 
 Causes of Color: Peacock feathers
 Butterflies and Gyroids – Numberphile

Color
Animal coat colors
Optical materials
Nanotechnology